Scutellastra laticostata is a species of sea snail, a true limpet, a marine gastropod mollusk in the family Patellidae, one of the families of true limpets.

Description

Distribution

References

 Nakano T. & Ozawa T. (2007). Worldwide phylogeography of limpets of the order Patellogastropoda: molecular, morphological and paleontological evidence. Journal of Molluscan Studies 73(1): 79–99

Patellidae
Gastropods described in 1825